Miracle is an unincorporated community located in Bell County, Kentucky, United States.

The community has the name of the local Miracle family.

References

Unincorporated communities in Bell County, Kentucky
Unincorporated communities in Kentucky